The  Jordan Design and Development Bureau (JODDB) is a Jordanian defence company. that was established by Royal Decree on 24 August 1999 to provide an indigenous capability for the supply of scientific and technical services to the Jordanian Armed Forces (JAF). JODDB was also created for the supply of defense and commercial equipment optimized for Middle East requirements. It is an independent agency within the Jordanian Armed Forces tasked with operating according to best business practices and is financed both through the defense budget and by technology, products and services sales incomes.

JODDB employs approximately 200 military and civilian personnel within its two Strategic Business Units (SBUs). The majority of its staff work in the Engineering Group located within the King Hussein Main Workshops. Headquartered in central Amman, JODDB is organized into three divisions: the Engineering Group, the Manufacturing Group, and the Programs group.

JODDB Investment Group
Launched on January 1, 2010, the JODDB Investment Group has been established to act as the commercial arm for the King Abdullah II Design and Development Bureau (JODDB). The JODDB Investment Group aims at establishing new businesses in the Defense, security and Automotive industries along with all services that would complement these industries.

KIG handles all business-related activities by having its team evaluate an opportunity all the way to realizing its full potential as well as develop the current businesses through implementation of business development, marketing and communication activities, in addition to enhancing the Group's corporate image. Moreover, the Group carries out marketing and communication tasks for JODDB Investment Group.

JODDB Industrial Park

In October 2009, King Abdullah II inaugurated the JODDB Industrial Park (KADDB IP), which is the first comprehensive free zone in the Middle East, specialized in the defense industry and the manufacturing of vehicles. KADDB IP is a public limited liability company owned completely by the Jordan Design and Development Bureau (JODDB).  It was established in 2006 in accordance with the Free Zones Law to upgrade Jordan's industrial base, attract investments, and encourage the development of interactive industries for manufacturing vehicles, in the context of an environment that attracts investment by offering incentives, tax exemptions, and excellent logistical services such as communications, infrastructure, and management. The Park also enjoys the security measures needed for defense industries and all other facilities to ensure the success of the investment. It is located on 3,800 dunams (1 dunam = 1,000 square meters) of land at Khalidiyah in the Mafraq Governorate, 50 km from Amman and 24 km from Zarqa, on the cross roads linking Jordan to Saudi Arabia, Iraq, and Syria, which facilitates the transportation of KADDB IP products to all countries in the region.

Subsidiaries and affiliates

Jordan Light Vehicle Manufacturing LLC (JLVM)
JLVM is a joint venture between KADDB and the Jankel Group Ltd of the UK to design, develop, produce, and market military vehicles.  Its main products are Al-Jawad troop carrier for internal security uses, Al-Tha’lab long-range reconnaissance vehicle.  JLVM, which has been operational since 2008, won the King Abdullah II Award for Excellence in 2010. JLVM vehicles production strategy is "Build to Order" and/or "Engineer to Order" to the customer's specific requirements ranging from soft skin and special purpose vehicles to fully armoured Internal Security Vehicles (ISVs) based on a variety of commercial off the shelf chassis. Other soft skin products such as 4x4 utility vehicles, LRPV, Ambulances, mobile medical solutions vehicles ...etc. are part of JLVM products portfolio.

Jordan Manufacturing and Services Solutions (JMSS)
JMSS is 100% owned by KADDB, staffed with workforce, equipped with infrastructure, which consists of 12,500M² workshops and stores, 50 tons overhead cranes, CNC Machines which include (Water Jet, Laser, 1000MT Press Brakes, CNC Plasma cutting machines, CNC tube bending) and owns heavy steel structure manufacturing up to tank assembly including hull machining machines, hull and turret manipulators and turning machines. Its activities include:
 Batch Manufacturing of medium and heavy vehicles
 Up to Depot Level Maintenance including rebuild, upgrade, modification and refurbishment of various vehicles types.
 Armor design, development and upgrade.
 Steel fabrication and manufacturing ( Railway, Potash, Cement and Phosphate industries)
 Armored Booth design and build.
 Design, development and building of live firing shooting ranges.

Special Operations Forces Exhibition (SOFEX)
SOFEX is the world's fastest growing and region's only special operations and homeland security exhibition and conference that features the largest fully integrated and innovative Special Operations Forces equipment and solutions from around the world.

JoSecure International
Jordan International Security Company (JoSecure) is a commercial entity fully owned by King Abdullah II Design and Development Bureau (KADDB). It was established, back in 2004, to provide a variety of high quality security services to governmental and private sectors both locally and throughout the region, by providing the highest levels of services and applications. Business units include: Man Guarding, Systems Integration, Tracking and Navigation, and Security and secured products.

Jordan Advanced Machining Company
Jordan AMCO's objective is to establish a location for precision manufacturing in Jordan to support the country's developing industrial base, as well as exploring regional and international export opportunities.

Jordan AMCO's intention is to be at the forefront of advanced manufacturing in Jordan, and as well as providing machining services on a direct supply basis we will also be providing technical assistance to other local manufactures with tooling selection, heat treatment, training requirements and assistance with understanding material properties and their machining characteristics etc.

Jordan Ammunition Manufacturing and Services Company (JORAMMO)
Jordan Ammunition Manufacturing and Services Company established in 2008 as a joint venture between KADDB, MECAR, a Belgian ammunition manufacturing company, and DMV, a holding company from the USA.  JORAMMO aims to become one of the largest centers in the Middle East and North Africa for the design, development, production of ammunition, conducting testing and qualification of the Company's products, and dematerializing ammunition.  The company caters for the ammunition needs of the Jordanian Armed Forces as well as other armed forces in the region and worldwide.

Others
 The Jordanian Company for Manufacturing Special Boots
 Arab Ready Meals 
 NP Aerospace Jordan
 Raytech Jordan
 Aerial Survey & Photography (ASP)
 The Jordan Russian Electronic Systems Company (JRESCO) 
 Design Jordan
 Seabird Aviation Jordan (SAJ)
 Prince Faisal Information Technology Center (PFITC)
 Jordan Armament & Weapon Systems (JAWS)
 Jordan Electro-Optics Company (JEOC).

References

External links

 
KADDB video

Defence companies of Jordan
1999 establishments in Jordan
Companies established in 1999
Industrial design firms